is a Japanese professional shogi player ranked 7-dan.

Early life
Hiroki Iizuka was born in Tokyo on April 2, 1969. He entered the Japan Shogi Association's apprentice school under the guidance of shogi professional  in December 1982 at the rank of 6-kyū. He was promoted to 1-dan in 1988, and then obtained full professional status and the rank of 4-dan in April 1992.

Promotion history
The promotion history for Iizuka is as follows:
 6-kyū: 1982
 1-dan: 1988
 4-dan: April 1, 1992
 5-dan: August 5, 1996
 6-dan: August 13, 2001
 7-dan: October 27, 2009

References

External links
ShogiHub: Professional Player Info · Iizuka, Hiroki

Japanese shogi players
Living people
Professional shogi players
Professional shogi players from Tokyo Metropolis
1969 births